Elizabeth ("Lizzy") Ryan (born 10 November 1985 in Hamilton, New Zealand) is a field hockey striker from New Zealand.

International senior competitions
 2005 – Champions Challenge, Virgiania Beach
 2006 – World Cup Qualifier, Rome

References
 New Zealand Field Hockey Federation

New Zealand female field hockey players
1985 births
Living people
20th-century New Zealand women
21st-century New Zealand women